The tindy is a snowboard grab in which the snowboarder grabs with his/her rear hand between the rear binding and the tail of the board on the toe edge.  Its name is derived from a combination of the indy grab and the tail grab.  The tindy grab is generally considered poor form in snowboarding.

External links
Onboard Magazine, "The Art of Grabbing and Grabbing Faux Pas"
An Excellent Video Explanation

References
Method Magazine, Methodology Snowboard Tips and Tricks: Back to Basics.

Snowboarding
Snowboarding tricks

es:Snowboard